Northcote Plaza Shopping Centre is a sub regional shopping centre located in Northcote, in the inner northern suburbs of Melbourne, the state capital of Victoria (Australia).

It was built on the site of the former kilns of the Northcote Brickworks Ltd (1882-1977) and opened in 1981.

Northcote Plaza Shopping Centre is located adjacent to the All Nations Park.

Kmart closed its Northcote Plaza store in November 2020.

Transport
Northcote Plaza Shopping Centre is served by the Number 86 tram, 508 and 552 bus (goes into the centre) and the Mernda railway line's Northcote station. Northcote Plaza Shopping Centre is a ten-minute walk from the St Georges (Number 11) tram.

References

External links

Shopping centres in Melbourne
Shopping malls established in 1981
Buildings and structures in the City of Darebin
1981 establishments in Australia